In the Pocket is the ninth studio album by the Commodores, released by Motown Records in 1981. It is the last Commodores album to feature Lionel Richie, as he left the band to start a solo career the following year. The bulk of the album was recorded at Web IV Recording Studio in Atlanta, Georgia. This album contained two hit singles, "Oh No" (U.S. #4) and "Lady (You Bring Me Up)" (U.S. #8).

Track listing

Charts

Weekly charts

Year-end charts

Certifications

Personnel 

Commodores
 Lionel Richie – vocals, pianos, keyboards, saxophones 
 Milan Williams – keyboards, vocals 
 Thomas McClary – vocals, guitars
 Ronald LaPread – bass, vocals 
 Walter Orange – drums, vocals, percussion
 William King – trumpet

Additional personnel
 David Cochrane – keyboards, guitars, saxophones 
 Harold Hudson – keyboards, trumpet, vocals 
 Darrell Jones – guitars 
 James Anthony Carmichael – horn and string arrangements 
 Gene Page – rhythm arrangements (4, 8)

Production 
The bulk of the album was recorded at Web IV Recording Studio in Atlanta, Georgia.

 Commodores – producers, arrangements
 James Anthony Carmichael – producer, arrangements 
 Calvin Harris – recording, mixing 
 Jane Clark – additional engineer
 Tommy Cooper – assistant engineer (1, 2, 3, 5, 6, 7)
 Ed Seay – assistant engineer (1, 2, 3, 5, 6, 7)
 Richard Well – assistant engineer (1, 2, 3, 5, 6, 7)
 Skip Cottrell – assistant engineer (4, 8)
 Bernie Grundman – mastering
 Johnny Lee – art direction, design 
 David Alexander – photography 
 Suzee Ikeda – project manager

References 

1981 albums
Commodores albums
Albums produced by James Anthony Carmichael
Albums produced by Lionel Richie
Motown albums
Albums recorded at A&M Studios